Im Sang-jo (임상조; 16 May 1930 – 13 September 2004) was a South Korean cyclist. He competed at the 1952 and 1956 Summer Olympics.

References

External links
 

1930 births
2004 deaths
South Korean male cyclists
Olympic cyclists of South Korea
Cyclists at the 1952 Summer Olympics
Cyclists at the 1956 Summer Olympics
Cyclists at the 1958 Asian Games
Asian Games medalists in cycling
Medalists at the 1958 Asian Games
Asian Games gold medalists for South Korea